Bienvenido Cedeno (born January 1, 1969) is a pitcher who is most notable for being on Panama's roster for the 2006 World Baseball Classic. He made two appearances in that World Baseball Classic, allowing seven hits in  innings of work, posting a 4.91 ERA. He also represented Panama in the 1997 Central American Games, when they won gold, and in the 2001 Bolivarian Games, when they won gold.

He is right-handed, and 5'8" tall and 175 pounds.

References

1969 births
Living people
2006 World Baseball Classic players